The Armoured Multirole Carrier (AMC) is an eight-wheeled armoured personnel carrier designed by Renault Trucks Défense, part of Renault Trucks. A concept model was put on display for the first time at Eurosatory 2008. It is one of the contenders to replace the VAB, also made by Renault, around 2020, as part of "Project Scorpion", a large-scale military modernization programme.

The AMC is a high-mobility medium armoured vehicle. A wide range of different models is planned, including six-wheel drive variants.

Versions 
 Armoured transport
 Infantry combat vehicle
 Troop transport
 Mobile command centre (AMC-PC)
 Ambulance (AMC-SAN)
 HOT launcher (AMC-HOT)
 Anti-air missile launcher
 Mortar truck
 Artillery observation
 NBC reconnaissance
 Decontamination centre
 Minesweeper
 20mm turret AMC

References  

AMC on Renault Trucks Défense

Infantry fighting vehicles
Armoured personnel carriers of the post–Cold War period
Armoured personnel carriers of France
Amphibious armoured personnel carriers
Eight-wheeled vehicles
Wheeled amphibious armoured fighting vehicles